One World Action was a charity based in London whose aims were a world free from poverty and oppression, where strong democracies safeguard people's rights.

One World Action supported partner organizations in Asia, Africa and Central America.  There work was founded on the principles of democracy. Many supported projects tackle gender inequality.

All its program's are initiated by local people, providing understanding and meeting of local needs.

Formerly named the Bernt Carlsson Trust, One World Action was founded by Glenys Kinnock on December 21, 1989 – exactly one year after UN Commissioner for Namibia, Bernt Carlsson, was killed in the Pan Am Flight 103 crash.

The charity was affiliated with Solidar.

It was removed from the register of charities on 2 October 2012 on the grounds that it had ceased to exist.

Activities
 Nearly 300,000 people in Angola were given access to clean water through the work of a One World Action partner, the Development Workshop.
 Through mediation a One World Action partner, Nagorik Uddyog has settled nearly 1000 separate cases of conflict involving the poor in Bangladesh.
 In Nicaragua a One World Action partner, Movimiento Maria Elena Cuadra, provides training to women factory workers in the Export Processing Zones about labor rights and health & safety.
 One World Action is thought to be behind the politicalcompass.org website.

References

External links 
 One World Action Web Page

1989 establishments in the United Kingdom
Pan Am Flight 103
Development charities based in the United Kingdom
Charities based in London
Poverty-related organizations
Organizations established in 1989